or  was a Japanese political slogan meaning the divine right of the Empire of Japan to "unify the eight corners of the world." The slogan formed the basis of the empire's ideology. It was prominent from the Second Sino-Japanese War to World War II and was popularized in a speech by Prime Minister Fumimaro Konoe on January 8, 1940.

Background

The term was coined early in the 20th century by the Nichiren Buddhist activist and nationalist Tanaka Chigaku, who cobbled it from parts of a statement attributed in the chronicle  to legendary first Emperor Jimmu at the time of his ascension. The emperor's full statement reads:  (in the original), and means: "I shall cover the eight directions and make them my abode".

Ambiguous in its original context, Tanaka interpreted the statement, attributed to Jimmu, as meaning that imperial rule had been divinely ordained to expand until it united the entire world. While Tanaka saw that outcome as resulting from the emperor's moral leadership, many of his followers were less pacifist in their outlook, despite some intellectuals' awareness of the inherent nationalist implications and reactions to the term. Koyama Iwao (1905–1993), disciple of Nishida, and drawing off the Flower Adornment Sutra, proposed the interpretation "to be included or to find a place" for the last two characters ("to make them my abode"). That understanding was rejected by the military circles of the nationalist right.

Origins

There were enough Japanese in Western nations that suffered from racial discrimination issues that in 1919, Japan proposed a racial equality clause at the Paris Peace Conference. The proposal received the support of a majority but was vetoed by US President Woodrow Wilson in violation of the rules of the Conference that allowed a majority vote. In 1924, the US Congress enacted the Asian Exclusion Act, outlawing immigration from Asia.

Worsened with the economic impact of the Shōwa financial crisis and the Great Depression in the 1930s, which led to a resurgence of nationalist, militarist and expansionist movements. The naval limitations treaties of 1921 and especially 1930 were seen as a mistake in their unanticipated effect on internal political struggles in Japan, and the treaties provided an external motivating catalyst that provoked reactionary militarist elements to desperate actions, with their presence overtaking civilian and liberal elements in society.

The evolution of  serves as a changing litmus test of those factional relationships during the next decade.

In the most magnanimous form, the term was used to indicate the making of a universal brotherhood implemented by the uniquely-virtuous Yamato. Because that would bring people under the emperor's fatherly benevolence, force was justified against those who resisted. The Japanese additionally undertook many projects to prove that they supported racial equality. For example, on December 6, 1938, the Five Ministers Council (Prime Minister Fumimaro Konoe, Army Minister Seishirō Itagaki, Navy Minister Mitsumasa Yonai, Foreign Minister Hachirō Arita and Finance Minister Shigeaki Ikeda), the highest decision-making council at the time, took the decision to prohibit the expulsion of the Jews from Japan, Manchuria, and China. Thereafter, the Japanese received Jewish refugees despite the opposition of their ally Nazi Germany.

1940 was declared the 2,600th anniversary of the founding of Japan in part to celebrate . As part of the celebrations, the government officially opened the  monument (now Heiwadai Tower) at what is now Miyazaki Peace Park in the city of Miyazaki.

World War II
As the Second Sino-Japanese War dragged on without conclusion, the Japanese government turned increasingly to the nation's spiritual capital to maintain fighting spirit.

In 1940, the Imperial Rule Assistance Association was launched to provide political support to Japan's war in China.

The general spread of the term , neatly encapsulating this view of expansion as mandated in Japan's divine origin, was further propelled by preparations for celebrating the 2,600th anniversary of Jimmu's ascension, which fell in the year 1940 according to the traditional chronology. Stories recounted that Jimmu, finding five races in Japan, had made them all as "brothers of one family".

Propaganda purposes

To win the support of the conquered, Japanese propaganda included phrases such as "Asia for the Asians!" and emphasized about the perceived need to liberate Asian countries from imperialist powers. The failure to win the war in China was blamed on British and American exploitation of Southeast Asian colonies, even though the Chinese received far more assistance from the Soviet Union. In some cases local populations welcomed Japanese troops when they invaded, driving out British, French and other colonial powers.

The official translation offered by contemporary leaders was "universal brotherhood", but it was widely acknowledged that that expression meant that the Japanese were "equal to the Caucasians but, to the peoples of Asia, we act as their leader".
Hence  could be seen as a euphemism for Japanese supremacy. In fact, the brutality and the racism of the Japanese led the conquered to view the Japanese imperialists as being equal to or sometimes worse than Western imperialists. For example, the economies of most occupied territories were remanaged only to produce raw war materials for Japan.

Allied judgment
 meant the bringing together of the corners of the world under one ruler, or the making of the world's one family. That was the alleged ideal of the foundation of the empire, and, in its traditional context, meant no more than a universal principle of humanity, which was destined ultimately to pervade the whole universe.

Aftermath

Since the end of the Pacific War, some have highlighted the  slogan as part of a context of historical revisionism. The  monument was renamed  in 1958 and still stands today. The writing "" was removed from it after the Japanese defeat at the insistence of the U.S. military. The tower was the inception point for the torch relay of the 1964 Summer Olympics. After the Olympics, which coincided with worldwide interest in the Japanese Imperial family, the local tourism association successfully petitioned the Miyazaki Prefecture to reinstall the "" characters.

See also
 An Investigation of Global Policy with the Yamato Race as Nucleus
 Greater East Asia Conference
 
 Japanese militarism
 Japanese nationalism
 Statism in Shōwa Japan
 
 Manifest destiny
 
 
 
 Tanaka Memorial
 World domination

Notes

References

Bibliography
 Beasley, William G. (1991).   Japanese Imperialism 1894–1945. Oxford: Oxford University.  .
 Bix, Herbert P. (2001).  Hirohito and the Making of Modern Japan. New York: HarperCollins. .
 Brendon, Piers (2002).   The Dark Valley: A Panorama of the 1930s. New York: Vintage. .
 Brownlee, John (1997).  Japanese Historians and the National Myths, 1600–1945: The Age of the Gods. Vancouver: University of British Columbia Press. .
 Earhart, David C. (2007).  Certain Victory: Images of World War II in the Japanese Media.  Armonk, New York: M.E. Sharpe.  .
 Edwards, Walter.   "Forging Tradition for a Holy War: The Hakkō Ichiu Tower in Miyazaki and Japanese Wartime Ideology." Journal of Japanese Studies 29:2 (2003).
 Morison, Samuel Eliot (1948).   History of United States Naval Operations in World War II: The Battle of the Atlantic, September 1939 – May 1943.  Oxford: Oxford University Press. 40 editions – [reprinted by University of Illinois Press at Urbana, 2001. ].
 Kosei, Ishii (2002).   The idea of "co-prosperity Sphere of Greater East Asia" and the Buddhist philosophy - the role of the School of Kyoto. Paris: Inalco. .

External links

  "Hakkō ichiu theory", in "All-Out Japanese Attacks" History of the Last War no. 15 (2011).

1940 in Japan
Axis powers
Exceptionalism
Far-right politics in Japan
Foreign relations of the Empire of Japan
Japanese historical terms
Japanese militarism
Japanese philosophy
Military history of Japan during World War II
Political catchphrases
Racism in Japan
Second Sino-Japanese War
Shōwa Statism
World government